Birmingham, Stechford, may refer to:

 Stechford, a district of the city of Birmingham, England
 Birmingham Stechford (UK Parliament constituency) (1950–1983)